Ordena Stephens-Thompson is a Jamaican Canadian actress from Toronto, Ontario, Canada. Stephens-Thompson is best known for starring in the Canadian television sitcom Da Kink in My Hair as Novelette "Letty" Campbell.

Born in Jamaica, and raised in the Scarborough, Toronto district of Toronto. Stephen-Thompson is also a frequent stage actress in the Toronto theatre scene, including productions of Da Kink in My Hair, How Black Mothers Say I Love You, and Other Side of the Game.

Filmography

Film

Television

References

External links
 

1970 births
Canadian stage actresses
Canadian television actresses
Black Canadian actresses
Jamaican emigrants to Canada
Living people